Bryan is a city and the county seat of Brazos County, Texas, United States. It is located in the heart of the Brazos Valley (East and Central Texas). As of the 2020 census, the city had a population of 83,980. Bryan borders the city of College Station, which lies to its south. Together they are referred to as the Bryan–College Station metropolitan area, which has a population of more than 250,069.

History

The area around Bryan was part of a land grant to Moses Austin by Spain. Austin's son, Stephen F. Austin, helped bring settlers to the area. Among the settlers was William Joel Bryan, the nephew of Stephen Austin. In 1866 the county seat of Brazos County was changed from Boonville to Bryan, and a post office was opened. In 1867, after many delays caused by the Civil War, the Houston and Texas Central Railroad, which had only previously gotten as far as Millican, finally reached Bryan. A short time later, in 1871, the city of Bryan became incorporated. Just south of Bryan, Texas A&M College opened in 1876 in what later would be known as College Station. The following year, 1877 saw the establishment of the Bryan Independent School District. Keeping up with progress in the rest of the country, Bryan added electric lighting and a waterworks to its community in 1889. The fifth Brazos County courthouse was built in 1892, and by the turn of the century, in 1900, the International-Great Northern Railroad stopped in Bryan.

Using a generous grant of $10,000 from Andrew Carnegie, the Carnegie Library of Bryan opened its doors in 1902. A bell, made in 1905 and rung in 1918 to signal the end of World War I is still located out front today. In 1910 the town built an interurban railroad to College Station. By 1923 the line was abandoned. The first Jewish place of worship, the Temple Freda synagogue, was opened in 1913. During the 1930s the town of North Oakwood merged with Bryan. Now Bryan and College Station are "twin" cities. In 1936 State Highway 6 was built, running right through town.

In 2006, the Texas A&M University System announced that the new Texas A&M Health Science Center campus would be built in Bryan near the new Traditions Golf Course development.

A fire at the El Dorado Chemical Co. in 2009 caused the evacuation of 70,000 residents due to the burning of ammonium nitrate, possibly causing minor respiratory problems. However, the city requested that only "anyone who can smell smoke or see smoke to evacuate their homes and businesses" and did not enforce an evacuation except for 500 homes in the nearby vicinity of the fire. Less than 1,000 residents chose to evacuate, taking shelter at Texas A&M University, which closed its campus for the day to ease traffic problems. City fire officials chose to let the fire burn down before tackling it, since the chemicals were water reactive. The evacuation, which started at 2:30 pm CST ended at 7 pm, except for a small, defined area immediately around the fire, where approximately 100 Bryan residents lived. In the end, only 500 residents were under a mandatory evacuation, and 35 people were treated for respiratory problems from the smoke. Officials from El Dorado said there was never any danger from the smoke or fire. The warehouse, valued at just under $1 million, was destroyed.

In 2010, the Brazos County District Attorney's Office started the enforcement of a "Gang Safety Zone" in response to an escalation in violence within Bryan. Major US papers and ABC News covered this move. Cities like Houston and Los Angeles looked to the Bryan model of safety enforcement surrounding gang violence. The injunction declared a  area in Bryan as the Gang Safety Zone. This placed about half of downtown in the area.

In 2013 the Planned Parenthood clinic in Bryan closed as a result of state budget cuts which impacted family-planning facilities. The facility began offering abortions in 1998; it was one of three in the state which ceased operations on August 31, 2013.

On April 8, 2021, a workplace shooting occurred in Bryan. An employee of Kent Moore Cabinets, a local cabinet-making company, killed one person and injured five others, four of them critically. He then fled but was later taken into police custody, shooting and injuring a state trooper in the process. In June, 27-year-old suspect Larry Bollin was indicted by a grand jury on charges of murder and aggravated assault.

Geography
Bryan is located northwest of the center of Brazos County. It is bordered to the southeast by the city of College Station and to the northwest by the unincorporated community of Lake Bryan. The Brazos River flows past approximately nine miles to the southwest.

Climate
The local climate is subtropical and temperate, and winters are mild with periods of low temperatures usually lasting less than two months. Snow and ice are extremely rare. Summers are warm and hot with occasional showers being the only real variation in weather.

Demographics

As of the 2020 United States census, there were 83,980 people, 30,647 households, and 18,659 families residing in the city.

As of the census of 2000, there were 65,660 people, 23,759 households, and 14,873 families residing in the city. The population density was 1,515.2 people per square mile (584.9/km2). There were 25,703 housing units at an average density of 593.1 per square mile (229.0/km2). The racial makeup of the city was 64.65% White, 17% African American, 0.40% Native American, 1.65% Asian, 0.08% Pacific Islander, 13.32% from other races, and 2.17% from two or more races. Hispanic or Latino of any ethnicity/nationality were 17.83% of the population.

There were 23,759 households, out of which 32.3% had children under the age of 18 living with them, 44.2% were married couples living together, 14.0% had a female householder with no husband present, and 37.4% were non-families. 26.1% of all households were made up of individuals, and 7.7% had someone living alone who was 65 years of age or older. The average household size was 2.65 and the average family size was 3.27.

In the city, the population was spread out, with 27.0% under the age of 18, 18.1% from 18 to 24, 29.8% from 25 to 44, 15.8% from 45 to 64, and 9.3% who were 65 years of age or older. The median age was 28 years. For every 100 females, there were 99.2 males. For every 100 females age 18 and over, there were 95.7 males.

The median income for a household in the city was $31,672, and the median income for a family was $41,433. Males had a median income of $29,780 versus $22,428 for females. The per capita income for the city was $15,770. About 15.5% of families and 22.3% of the population were below the poverty line, including 27.0% of those under age 18 and 11.7% of those age 65 or over.

Economy

Parks and recreation
Sports complexes and recreation centers include: Kyle Field, Merrill Green Stadium, Reed Arena, Olsen Field at Blue Bell Park, American Momentum Bank Ballpark, G. Rollie White Coliseum, Anderson Track and Field Complex, Aggie Soccer Complex, Bryan Regional Athletic Complex, Aggie Softball Complex, George P. Mitchell Tennis Center, Spirit Ice Arena, The City Course at Phillips Event Center, and Bryan Aquatic Center.

Government

State
The Texas Department of Criminal Justice (TDCJ) operates the Hamilton Unit, a pre-release facility in Bryan. Hamilton opened as an adult prison facility. It was renovated for juveniles and, in mid-1997, re-opened as the Texas Youth Commission (TYC) J.W. Hamilton Jr. State School. On June 15, 2003, the facility was transferred back to the TDCJ. The TDCJ also operates the Bryan District Parole Office in nearby College Station.

Federal
The United States Postal Service operates the Bryan and Downtown Bryan post offices. The Federal Bureau of Prisons operates the Federal Prison Camp, Bryan, a women's prison located in Bryan.

Education

Colleges
 Blinn College – Bryan Campus
 Texas A&M Health Science Center

Public schools
 Bryan Independent School District

Independent schools
 Allen Academy:  PK–12 College Preparatory
 St. Joseph Catholic School:  PK–12 College Preparatory
 St. Michaels Academy:  PK–12 College Preparatory
 Brazos Christian School:  PK–12 College Preparatory
 Still Creek Ranch: Private K-12 Boarding and Day School
  Arrow Academy: K-6

Media

Publications
 The Bryan-College Station Eagle (main newspaper)
 La Voz Hispana (Spanish language weekly)
 The Battalion (Texas A&M)
 The Press
 Insite Magazine (local magazine – monthly publication)
 Bryan Broadcasting Publications
 The Jail Times (Locally owned and operated independent newspaper, Bryan/College Station)

Radio
 KAMU-FM NPR 90.9  (National Public Radio)
 KBXT 101.9 THE BEAT
 KVLX 103.9 K-LOVE (Contemporary Christian)
 KKYS Mix 104.7 (Hot A/C)
 KNDE 95.1 Candy 95 (Top 40)
 KNFX-FM 99.5 The Fox (Classic Rock)
 KVJM 103.1 La Preciosa (Regional Mexican)(Formerly V103.1 Hip Hop/Power 94)
 KZNE 1150 The Zone (ESPN Sports Radio)
 WTAW 1620  (Talk Radio)
 KEOS 89.1 Community Radio For The Brazos Valley
 KORA-FM 98.3 The Texas Country Original
 KPWJ 107.7 Peace

Television

 KAGS-LD 23 (NBC) – Daily, live newscasts from studio on Texas Avenue in Bryan
 KBTX-TV 3  (CBS, with CW on DT2) – Daily, live newscasts from studio on 29th Street in Bryan
 KAMU-TV 12 (PBS)
 KYLE-TV 28  (MNTV, with Fox [via KWKT-TV in Waco] on DT2)
 KRHD-CD 40 (ABC) – A satellite of KXXV in Waco

Infrastructure

Transportation
The Brazos Transit District began offering bus service in the Bryan-College Station in 1974. It offers fixed bus routes throughout Bryan-College Station. Operating on weekdays on an hourly basis, the seven routes converge at a central location for transferring between routes. It also offers paratransit services for disabled riders and an on-demand shared ride service. Texas A&M University, headquartered in sister city College Station, operates student-driven free buses on weekdays for use by the general public that includes coverage around several apartment complexes in Bryan near campus and along a route that culminates at the campus of Blinn College.

Airports
Bryan is served commercially by Easterwood Airport, a regional airport operated by Texas A&M University in College Station. American Eagle offers flights to and from their larger hub airport at Dallas/Fort Worth International Airport.

The city of Bryan owns and operates Coulter Field and provides fixed-base operator services, hangar space, and runways for private flights.

Major roads

 U.S. Highway 190
 State Highway 6: Earl Rudder Freeway (East Loop)
 State Highway 6 Business:Texas Avenue
 State Highway 21: San Jacinto
 State Highway 47
 Farm to Market Road 60:  University Drive
 Farm to Market Road 158:  William J. Bryan Parkway / Boonville Road
 Farm to Market Road 974:  Tabor Road
 Farm to Market Road 1179:  Briarcrest Drive
 Farm to Market Road 2154:  Wellborn Road
 Farm to Market Road 2818:  Harvey Mitchell Parkway (West Loop)

Health care
 St. Joseph Regional Health Center (310 Bed/Level II Trauma Center)
 Scott & White Hospital (143 Bed/Level III Trauma Center)

Notable people

 R.J.Q. Adams, historian and author
 Lynn Aldrich, sculptor and educator
 Walter L. Buenger, historian at Texas A&M University
 Melvin Bullitt, National Football League free safety (Colts)
 Gerald Carter, NFL wide receiver (Jets/Buccaneers)
 James T. Draper, Jr., Texas Southern Baptist clergyman who began his pastorate in Bryan in 1956
 Linda Ellerbee, NBC broadcast journalist
 Bill Flores, congressman from Texas from 2011 to 2021
 Roy Bill Garcia, radio personality
 R. T. Guinn is an American professional basketball player
 Jack Kingston, congressman from First District of Georgia
 David Konderla, Roman Catholic bishop
 Devin Lemons, NFL linebacker (Redskins)
 Don McLeroy, dentist in Bryan; former member of the Texas State Board of Education known for his conservative educational philosophy 
 Aries Merritt, 2012 Olympic gold medalist in 110-meter hurdles
 William T. "Bill" Moore, state senator from 1949 to 1981, known as "the Bull of the Brazos" and "the father of the modern Texas A&M University"
 Steve Ogden, Republican former member of both houses of the state legislature; a Bryan oil and gas businessman
 John N. Raney, member of the Texas House of Representatives from Brazos County since 2011; reared in Bryan, businessman and resident of College Station
 Raini Rodriguez, actress and singer who appeared in Paul Blart: Mall Cop and the Disney channel's Austin & Ally
 Rico Rodriguez, young actor known best for his role in the ABC sitcom Modern Family
 Shawn Slocum, special teams coordinator of the Green Bay Packers
 Syndric Steptoe, NFL wide receiver (Browns)
 Doug Supernaw, country music artist
 Ty Warren, NFL defensive end (Patriots)
 Charles F. Widdecke, decorated Major general of the Marine Corps

See also

 College Station, Texas, neighboring sister city
 James Bryan (mining executive); the name "Bryan" traces back to him in particular

References

External links

 
 Bryan Visitors & Convention Bureau
 Bryan Chamber of Commerce

 
Cities in Texas
Cities in Brazos County, Texas
County seats in Texas
Bryan–College Station
Populated places established in 1821